The 2009 CFL Draft took place on Saturday, May 2, 2009 at 11:00 AM ET on TSN. 48 players were chosen from among 774 eligible players from Canadian universities across the country, as well as Canadian players playing in the NCAA. Of the 48 draft selections, 38 players were drafted from Canadian Interuniversity Sport institutions, including the first seven.

The first two rounds were broadcast live on TSN with CFL Commissioner Mark Cohon announcing each selection. The production was hosted by Rod Black and featured the CFL on TSN panel which included Duane Forde, Steve Sumarah, Stefan Ptaszek, Farhan Lalji, Glen Suitor, Matt Dunigan, and Chris Schultz who analyzed the teams' needs and picks.

Round one

Round two

Round three

Round four

Round five

Round six

Further reading

Notes

Canadian College Draft
Cfl Draft, 2009